Semper fi is a shortened form of the Latin phrase semper fidelis.

Semper fi (Semper Fi) may also refer to:

 "Semper Fi (1988), an episode from season one of Sonny Spoon
 "Semper Fi (1989), a 9-issue comic book series published by Marvel Comics
 "Semper Fi (2000), a Huffamoose song from I Wanna Be Your Pants
 "Semper Fi (2009), an episode of Kamen Rider: Dragon Knight
 "Semper Fi (2011), a Trace Adkins song from Proud to Be Here, deluxe edition
 Semper Fi: Always Faithful (2011), a documentary film about the Camp Lejeune water contamination
 Semper Fi, a TV film in the McBride (2005) movie series
 "Semper Fi", a 1964 story by Damon Knight
 Semper Fi (film), a British film starring Jai Courtney and Nat Wolff
 Semper Fi (video game), a 1998 video game from Interactive Magic

See also
 Semper fidelis (disambiguation)
 Semper Phi